Blitar, is a city in East Java, Indonesia.

Blitar may also refer to:
 Blitar Regency, a regency in East Java, Indonesia
 Blitar railway station, a railway station in Blitar
 PSBK Blitar, football club based in Blitar Regency
 PSBI Blitar, football club based in Blitar City
 SMP Negeri 1 Blitar, public junior high school in Blitar
 SMA Negeri 1 Blitar, public senior high school in Blitar